Galaxyland Powered by Hasbro
(formerly Galaxyland, Fantasyland), is an indoor amusement park located in the West Edmonton Mall in Edmonton, Alberta, Canada. It was home to the world's tallest (14 stories) and longest indoor roller coaster, the Mindbender. The record was broken by Nickelodeon Skyline Scream at American Dream in East Rutherford, New Jersey in 2019.

History
Galaxyland was originally known as Fantasyland from 1983 to 1995. However, the name "Fantasyland" was already used for one of the lands of the themes existing in Disneyland and other theme parks, like the Magic Kingdom in Walt Disney World, Hong Kong Disneyland, Disneyland Park in Paris, Tokyo Disneyland, and Shanghai Disneyland Park, owned by the Walt Disney Company. A lawsuit eventually forced the mall's owners to change the park's name, though they were allowed to continue using the name "Fantasyland Hotel" for a hotel in the mall. Fantasyland became Galaxyland officially on July 1, 1995. This was celebrated with a new Space Age theme and the arrival of the park's new mascot, "Cosmo".

On December 18, 2019, it was announced that Galaxyland would undergo a renovation to be completed by late 2020, featuring new attractions licensed from Hasbro franchises. Balloon Race, Cosmic Bounce, Ropes Quest, and Zero Gravity are currently the only rides confirmed to be affected by the redesign. The redesign construction began in December 2019, with its grand opening as "Galaxyland powered by Hasbro" and was scheduled for the winter of 2020 but was postponed to December 17, 2022

Galaxyland remained closed for most of the 2020 season due to the COVID-19 pandemic.

1986 Mindbender accident

On June 14, 1986, a wheel sheared off the last car on the train of the Mindbender and the train crashed at high speed into a concrete pillar, killing three of the ride's occupants. Since then the ride has had several safety improvements, including more routine maintenance checks and three emergency brake sections added to the track.

Rides 
There are a total of 23 different rides operating in Galaxyland.

List of rides

Decommissioned rides

See also
World Waterpark

References

External links
Official Galaxyland website

1983 establishments in Alberta
1985 establishments in Alberta
1986 establishments in Alberta
Amusement parks in Canada
Indoor amusement parks
Tourist attractions in Edmonton
Outer space in amusement parks
Amusement parks opened in 1983
Amusement parks opened in 1985
Amusement parks opened in 1986
Space Age